The Tanzer 25 is a Canadian trailerable sailboat, that was designed by the French company of Joubert-Nivelt and first built in 1986. The design is out of production.

Production
Production of the boat was commenced in 1986 by Tanzer Industries of Dorion, Quebec. The company entered bankruptcy in May of that same year and production ended. The design then passed to a series of builders, including Canadian Yacht Builders, Challenger Yachts and Mirage Yachts.

Design

The Tanzer 25 is a small recreational keelboat, built predominantly of fibreglass, with wood trim. It has a fractional sloop rig, a transom-hung rudder and a fixed fin keel or optionally, a shoal-draft keel. It displaces  and carries  of ballast.

The boat is normally fitted with a small  inboard motor or outboard motor for docking and maneuvering.

The design has sleeping accommodation for four people, with a double "V"-berth in the bow cabin and an aft cabin with a double berth on the port side. The galley is located on the port side just forward of the companionway ladder. The galley is equipped with a two-burner stove and a sink. A navigation station is opposite the galley, on the starboard side. The head is located just aft of the companionway on the starboard side.

The boat has a PHRF racing average handicap of 180 with a high of 174 and low of 189.

See also
List of sailing boat types

Similar sailboats
Beachcomber 25
Bayfield 25
Beneteau First 25.7
Beneteau First 25S
Beneteau First 260 Spirit
Bombardier 7.6
Cal 25
Cal 2-25
C&C 25
Capri 25
Catalina 25
Catalina 250
Com-Pac 25
Dufour 1800
Freedom 25
Hunter 25.5
Jouët 760
Kirby 25
Kelt 7.6
O'Day 25
MacGregor 25
Merit 25
Mirage 25
Northern 25
Redline 25
Sirius 26
US Yachts US 25
Watkins 25

References

External links

Keelboats
1980s sailboat type designs
Sailing yachts
Sailboat type designs by Joubert-Nivelt
Sailboat types built by Tanzer Industries
Sailboat types built by Canadian Yacht Builders
Sailboat types built by Challenger Yachts
Sailboat types built by Mirage Yachts